Integrated Medical Systems International, Inc., (IMS) is a surgical instrument management and clinical consulting company specializing in repair management, sterile process management, tracking, and other services related to surgical and endoscopic devices and instruments. Today the company operates repair facilities in Alabama, Florida, and Maryland. IMS has more than 1,200 employees nationwide.

History
The company was originally incorporated in 1982, as Gibson-Robinson, Inc., as a distributor of products utilized in the operating room. In 1987, the company name was changed to IMS. The company focused on distributing until 1990 when repair services were added. The company now provides a range of services and products related to operating room efficiency.

Services

Repair Management

IMS provides refurbishment, education, process improvement, inventory management and related services for 2,500 hospitals and surgery centers. IMS repairs flexible and rigid endoscopes and stainless, laparoscopic, power, ophthalmic, and specialty instruments.  With expertise in mechanical, electrical, optical, materials, and applied engineering, IMS operates three repair facilities in addition to performing On-Location repairs.

Central Sterile Process Management

Offerings include education, certification readiness, regulatory compliance, project management, OR/SPD asset management, and interim management and staffing.

Surgical Endoscopy Solutions

IMS Surgical Endoscopy Solutions teams directly support minimally invasive procedures, providing room setup and breakdown, in-room trouble-shooting, instrument decontamination, preference card management, and maintenance/repair of instrumentation and scopes.

Additional services

IMS offers used equipment. IMS software provides healthcare facilities with kit for tracking allograft tissue, implants, and medical devices.

Corporate executives
 Gene Robinson – Founder and chief executive officer
 Debra Jones Robinson – Managing Partner
 James R. Mundy III 
 Lee Robinson 
 William C. Phillips 
 Kellie Upchurch 
 David Strevy 
 Zoltan A. Bodor 
 Peter Bodor 
 Wayne Whitaker 
 Stephen N. Cullen

Facilities

IMS operates repair facilities for surgical and endoscopic instruments and devices in Alabama, Florida, and Maryland. The newest is a 52,300 square-foot operations center in Birmingham, Alabama for the repair of flexible endoscopes and power, stainless, laparoscopic, and specialty instruments. This facility is part of a 15-acre campus including a fitness center and 75,000-square-foot corporate headquarters currently under construction. Engineering and research are conducted at an IMS facility in Fort Lauderdale, Florida. The Florida facility also refurbishes rigid endoscopes and surgical power and camera equipment.

Wedge Manufacturing, Inc.

Wedge Manufacturing is an IMS subsidiary that uses Computer Numerical Control machinists to produce small parts for customers in the healthcare, aerospace, defense and other industries. In addition to production services, Wedge provides inspections, reverse engineering and prototype development. Wedge specializes in components for situations that require tight tolerances or unusual materials. In 2009, engineers at the University of Alabama at Birmingham worked with Wedge to create a bearing holder for the GLACIER cryogenic freezer, which the university was producing for use in the International Space Station.

Sponsorships and partnerships

Instruments of Mercy, Inc. is a non-profit organization sponsored by IMS. IOM repairs donated surgical instruments already in the hands of healthcare providers for mission trips. Instruments of Mercy has refurbished equipment for over 100 missions in over two dozen countries. Medical professionals preparing for mission trips may receive up to $6,000 in repair costs and up to 24 trips are supported annually. IOM's largest medical client is Mercy Ships.

IMS maintains relationships with professional organizations including: Association of periOperative Nurses (AORN), International Association of Healthcare Central Service Materiel Management (IAHCSMM), The Society of Gastroenterology Nurses and Associates (SGNA),the Association of Medical Instrumentation (AAMI), and the Association for Healthcare Resource & Materials Management (AHRMM).

Accolades
 Association of periOperative Registered Nurses' Jerry G. Peers Distinguished Service Award (2013)

References

Companies based in Birmingham, Alabama
Manufacturing companies established in 1982
Manufacturing companies based in Alabama
1982 establishments in Alabama